Crag Pit, Aldeburgh is a  geological Site of Special Scientific Interest in Aldeburgh in Suffolk. It is a Geological Conservation Review site, and within the Suffolk Coast and Heaths Area of Outstanding Natural Beauty.

This is the most northern site which exposes the Pliocene Coralline Crag Formation around five million years ago. It has rich and diverse fossils, including many bryozoans, and other fauna include serpulids and several boring forms.

This site, which has been filled in, is on private land with no public access.

References

Sites of Special Scientific Interest in Suffolk
Geological Conservation Review sites
Aldeburgh